Kapitanov ključ is a novel by Slovenian author Ivan Sivec. It was first published in 2004.

See also
List of Slovenian novels

Kapitanov ključ
“Vsaka potopljena ladja skriva v svojih nedrjih zaklad, tudi Rex, potopljen med Izolo in Koprom. Razlika je samo v tem, da je ta potopljena kraljica precej večja od znamenitega Titanika.”
Francesco Pinomare, kapitan dolge plovbe

VIR : https://sivec.net/portfolio-items/kapitanov-kljuc/

Slovenian novels
2004 novels